, stylized as DOLL$BOXX, are a Japanese all-female hard rock band formed in 2012. It is the side project of lead vocalist Fuki (formerly of power metal band Light Bringer, currently with Unlucky Morpheus and Fuki Commune) and the musicians of the rock group Gacharic Spin.

History 
After Gacharic Spin's original vocalist Armmy left to take a hiatus because of medical reasons, bassist and bandleader F Chopper Koga decided not to cancel the planned tour dates, instead using an arrangement of supporting vocalists including future Gacharic Spin member Oreo Reona, and Lightbringer's vocalist Fuki. Due to Gacharic Spin and Light Bringer taking a break from live performances, they decided to form a new band, musically different from their current bands.

The group's first studio album, Dolls Apartment, was released on December 12, 2012 in Japan and January 29, 2013 in Korea. They released promotional videos for every song in the album (not including the cover song Nudierythm) on a weekly basis on their Niconico channel. On August 27, 2014 they released a DVD collection of their music videos, Doll's Collection.

After an almost three-year hiatus, they reunited on February 25, 2017 for a triple-bill show with Gacharic Spin and Fuki Commune, and again on June 24, 2017 for Gacharic Spin tour finale where they premiered a new song and announced a new mini-album, High $pec.

Band members
 Fuki – lead vocals (2012–present)
 F Chopper Koga – bass (2012–present)
 Hana – drums, backing vocals (2012–present)
 Tomo-zo – guitars (2012–present)
 Oreo Reona – keyboards, backing vocals (2012–present)

Discography

Studio albums

Extended plays / mini-albums

Video albums

Music videos

References

External links 
 Official website of the group (current) 
 Earliest Archive of Official website of the group 
 Official website of the group at King Records

Japanese heavy metal musical groups
Japanese rock music groups
Victor Entertainment artists
All-female bands
Musical quintets